Lily Allen and Friends is a British TV talk show presented by Lily Allen. The programme was produced by Princess Productions for BBC Three. It was first shown on 12 February 2008.

The audience consists entirely of Lily's online friends, who sign up via the programme's website. Guests include celebrities, topical guests from the online world, chart-topping bands and lesser known acts chosen by the public. Also each week a member of the public has a chance to record a question for either of that week's guest along with an internet celebrity and a character known only as "Mary, the foul-mouthed grandma". Internet correspondents posed questions for the celebrities.

Host
The show was hosted by Lily Allen. Lily Allen and Friends was Allen's first venture into television presenting.

Format
The show was filmed at Pinewood Studios. The programme features a video diary of Lily's life outside the programme and a section titled weird and wonderful, highlighting internet videos in the YouTube Hero and MySpace Band items.

Reception

The BBC was criticised by several teacher unions for a video aired on show of 18 March 2008 that apparently showed a student running up from behind and pulling down his teacher's trousers. The unions said airing this clip was irresponsible and greatly added to the teacher's embarrassment.  While introducing the clip Allen called it kegging and said "It's very childish, but very funny".

As the tickets are simply distributed by an online ticket agency which anyone can apply for in an identical way to other TV shows, there was comment passed on whether statement "the audience consists entirely of Lily's online friends" was valid.

It was reported that during an interview with Paddy McGuinness, Allen exposed her breast to the audience for three minutes.

Episode guide

See also

 Lily Allen
 MySpace

References

External links
 
 Princess Productions
 

2008 British television series debuts
2008 British television series endings
BBC Television shows
BBC television talk shows
English-language television shows
Television series by Endemol
Television series produced at Pinewood Studios
Lily Allen